Italy-Turkey relations are the relations between Italy and Turkey. Both countries are members of NATO and the Union for the Mediterranean and have active diplomatic relations.
Italy is a member of the European Union, Turkey is not a member.

History

Ottoman relations with pre-unitary Italian States 
Prior to the Unification of Italy, several Italian states, most notably the Republic of Venice, fought wars against the Ottoman Empire in conflicts such as the Ottoman–Venetian wars (1396–1718) and others.

The Ottoman Empire attempted to invade Italy in 1480. The Ottoman invasion of Otranto occurred between 1480 and 1481 at the Italian city of Otranto in Apulia, southern Italy. Forces of the Ottoman Empire invaded and laid siege to the city and its citadel. After the refusal to surrender, the city was taken and about 12.000 inhabitant (all the male population) were killed and the others were enslaved: moreover, more than 800 inhabitants were beheaded after the city had been captured. The Martyrs of Otranto are still celebrated in Italy. A year later the Ottoman garrison surrendered the city following a siege by Christian forces and the intervention of Papal forces led by the Genoese Paolo Fregoso.

The Ottomans also briefly held Otranto once more after conquering it in 1537. Ottoman troops operated in Italy and surrounding islands as part of France's war to subdue the region.

Ottoman Empire – Kingdom of Italy relations 
The Ottoman Empire begun its first diplomatic mission to Italy in 1856, shortly before the establishment of the Kingdom of Italy, by sending Ambassador Rüstem Pasha. Since then, Turkey has had a constant presence in Italy throughout both their embassy in Rome and their consulates in Milan and Naples.

Starting from the late 19th century, Italy had a territorial claim over Ottoman Libya. This claim dated back to the Ottoman Empire's defeat by Russia during the war of 1877–1878 and subsequent discussions after the Congress of Berlin in 1878, in which France and the United Kingdom had agreed to the French occupation of Tunisia and British control over Cyprus respectively, which were both parts of the declining Ottoman Empire. When Italian diplomats hinted about possible opposition by their government, the French replied that Tripoli would have been a counterpart for Italy, which made a secret agreement with the British government in February 1887 via a diplomatic exchange of notes. The agreement stipulated that Italy would support British control in Egypt, and that Britain would likewise support Italian influence in Libya.

In 1902, a diplomatic crisis between Italy and the Ottoman Empire took place. The crisis began due to the Ottomans failing to prevent attacks by Turkish Arabs on Italian sambuks. When the Ottoman Empire refused to take precautions to prevent these attacks after repeated Italian threats, Italian warships bombarded Port Midi from 31 October onwards. On 10 November, the Ottoman Empire capitulated and agreed to take measures to curb piracy as well as pay an indemnity, ending the crisis. Also in 1902, Italy and France had signed a secret treaty which accorded freedom of intervention in Tripolitania and Morocco.From 1911 to 1912, Italy and the Ottoman Empire fought a war over the Turkish provinces of Tripolitana and Cyrenaica, with the former emerging as the victor. During the conflict, Italian forces also occupied the Dodecanese islands in the Aegean Sea. Italy agreed to return the Dodecanese to the Ottoman Empire in the Treaty of Ouchy in 1912. However, the vagueness of the text, combined with subsequent adverse events unfavourable to the Ottoman Empire (the outbreak of the Balkan Wars and World War I), allowed a provisional Italian administration of the islands, and Turkey eventually renounced all claims on these islands in Article 15 of the 1923 Treaty of Lausanne.

Turkish War of Independence and after 
During the Turkish War of Independence (1919–1923), Italy occupied Constantinople and a part of southwestern Anatolia but never fought the Turkish Army directly. During its occupation Italian troops protected Turkish civilians, who were living in the areas occupied by the Italian army, from Greek troops and accepted Turkish refugees who had to flee from the regions invaded by the Greek army. In July 1921 Italy began to withdraw its troops from southwestern Anatolia.

The Convention between Italy and Turkey, signed in Ankara on January 4, 1932, by the Italian Plenipotentiary, Ambassador Pompeo Aloisi, and the Turkish foreign minister Tevfik Rüştü Aras, settled a dispute that had arisen in the aftermath of the Treaty of Lausanne of 1923, about the sovereignty over a number of small islets and the delimitation of the territorial waters between the coast of Anatolia and the island of Kastellórizo, which was an Italian possession since 1921. Through the convention, the islets situated inside the bay of the harbour of Kastellorizo, along with the islands of Rho and Strongili further off, were assigned to Italy, while all other islets in the surrounding area were assigned to Turkey.

The Refah tragedy was a maritime disaster that took place during World War II, in June 1941, when the cargo steamer Refah of neutral Turkey, carrying Turkish military personnel from Mersin in Turkey to Port Said, Egypt, was sunk in eastern Mediterranean waters by a torpedo fired from an unidentified submarine. Of the 200 passengers and crew aboard, only 32 survived. A report published by the Italian Navy gives coordinates where the Italian submarine Ondina attacked vessels. The site of Refahs sinking matches that information. No country claimed responsibility for the attack on the Turkish ship. On 18 June 1941, Nazi Germany and Turkey signed the German–Turkish Treaty of Friendship.

In the 1990s, the diplomatic relations were very tense as Italy refused to extradite Abdullah Öcalan to Turkey, alleging that it was contrary to Italian Law that someone would be extradited into a country in which he would expect the death penalty. Turkey, who has displayed a lot of diplomatic pressure for the extradition, opposed such verdict. The Defense minister of Turkey Ismet Sezgin mentioned that Turkey would review the candidates for an order for attack helicopters worth of 3.5 Billion dollars, for which before the rejection of the extradition the main candidate was the Italian Finmeccanica. Mesut Yilmaz, the Turkish prime minister at the time also threatened that Italy is on track to earn Turkey's "eternal hostility".  

Italy's presence in Turkey now consists of an embassy in Ankara, a General Consulate in İstanbul, and a consulate in İzmir, together with honorary consulates in Antalya, Bursa, Gaziantep, İskenderun, and Nevşehir, and a Consular Correspondent in Eskişehir.

Relations worsened after Italian Foreign Minister Luigi Di Maio condemned the 2019 Turkish offensive into north-eastern Syria, declaring that the offensive against Kurdish forces in Syria is "unacceptable" and calling for an immediate end to the fighting. Italy joined an arms embargo against Turkey, despite previously being Turkey's primary EU weapons supplier. 

Following a diplomatic incident dubbed as Sofagate in April 2021, Mario Draghi's remarks describing Recep Tayyip Erdoğan as a "dictator" were heavily criticized by the Turkish Foreign Ministry. Erdogan condemned Draghi remark. As a result, relations deteriorated.

Intercultural influences

Italian culture in Turkey 
Istanbul is home to one of the Italian Cultural Institutes opened throughout the world by the Italian Ministry of Foreign Affairs. The Institute, among other cultural activities, offers Italian language courses, also offered by a number of Turkish universities, such as Ankara University and Istanbul University.

İzmir and Ankara are hosts to, respectively, the Italian Culture Center "Carlo Goldoni" and the Italian Friendship Association "Casa Italia". Both of these associations engage in the organisation of events promoting Italian culture and of courses teaching the Italian language.

A number of Italian schools are present in Turkey, with the great majority of them being located in Istanbul. Italian schools in Turkey include kindergartens, elementary, middle, and high schools.

Immigration
It is estimated that there are 30,000 to 40,000 Turks residing in Italy.

See also
Foreign relations of Italy
Foreign relations of Turkey 
Turkey–European Union relations
Italians in Turkey
Italians in Middle East
Turks in Italy 
Turks in Europe

References

External links 
 Website of the Embassy of the Republic of Italy in Turkey
 Website of the Italian Culture Center in İzmir
 Website of the Italian Institute of Culture in İstanbul
 Website of the Embassy of the Republic of Turkey in Italy

 
Turkey
Bilateral relations of Turkey